Rabanera is a village in the province and autonomous community of La Rioja, Spain.

Politics

Literature 
 Ernesto Reiner. Viaje por el Camero Viejo. 1984. 
 Various Authors in the '90s. 1991.

References

Populated places in La Rioja (Spain)